Dinapate hughleechi is a beetle from the Bostrichidae family. It is native to Mexico.

References

Bostrichidae
Beetles described in 1986
Insects of Mexico